Vemulapally is a village in Nalgonda district, Telangana, India. It is located in Vemulapally mandal of Miryalaguda division.

References

Mandal headquarters in Nalgonda district